An eSIM (embedded-SIM) is a form of SIM card that is embedded directly into a device. Instead of an integrated circuit located on a removable universal integrated circuit card (UICC), typically made of PVC, an eSIM consists of software installed onto an eUICC chip permanently attached to a device. If the eSIM is eUICC compatible, it can be re-programmed with new SIM information. Otherwise, the eSIM is programmed with it's ICCID/IMSI and other information at the time it is manufactured, and cannot be changed.

Once an eSIM carrier profile has been installed on an eUICC, it operates the same as a physical SIM, complete with a unique ICCID and network authentication key generated by the carrier.

The eSIM standard was first released in 2016; since that point, eSIM has begun to replace physical SIM in domains including cellular telephony.

History 
Since 2010, the GSMA had been discussing the possibility of a software-based SIM.

While Motorola noted that eUICC is geared at industrial devices, Apple "disagreed that there is any statement forbidding the use of an embedded UICC in a consumer product". Currently, the GSMA maintains two different versions of the standard: one for consumer devices and another for M2M devices.

A first version of the standard was published in March 2016, followed by a second version in November 2016.

Implementation 

In 2016, the Samsung Gear S2 Classic 3G smartwatch was the first device to implement an eSIM.

In 2017, during Mobile World Congress, Qualcomm introduced a technical solution, with a live demonstration, within its Snapdragon hardware chip associated with related software (secured Java applications).

Apple first introduced eSIM support in September 2017 with the Apple Watch Series 3. The first iPhone models to support it were the iPhone XS, iPhone XS Max, and iPhone XR, announced in September 2018. The first iPad model was the iPad Pro (3rd generation), announced in October 2018. In September 2022, Apple unveiled the iPhone 14, iPhone 14 Plus, iPhone 14 Pro, and iPhone 14 Pro Max, the first iPhone models not to have a SIM card tray and to work exclusively with eSIM. Outside the United States, all iPhone models continue to be sold with support for both eSIM and physical SIM cards, while in mainland China eSIM isn't supported at all.

Google unveiled the Pixel 2 in October 2017, which added eSIM support for use with its Google Fi service. In 2018, Google released the Pixel 3 and Pixel 3 XL and subsequently in May 2019, the Pixel 3a and Pixel 3a XL, with eSIM support for carriers other than Google Fi. In October that same year, Google released the Pixel 4 and Pixel 4 XL with eSIM support.

Motorola released the 2020 version of the Motorola Razr, a foldable smartphone that has no physical SIM slot since it only supports eSIM.

Plintron implemented the eSIM4Things Internet of things product, based on eSIM support for the devices and available in 28 countries.

Microsoft introduced eSIM to the Windows 10 operating system in 2018 and launched its first eSIM-enabled device, Surface Pro LTE, in 2017.

Samsung shipped Galaxy S21 and S20 series smartphones in the US with eSIM hardware onboard but no software support out of the box. The feature was later enabled with the One UI version 4 update. However, the implementation of the eSIM on the S21 and S20 in the US is different than the implementation in the rest of the world. The US version lacks the ability to specify different default SIMs for different functions, e.g., one SIM as the default for data and the other SIM as the default for voice. It requires that the same eSIM be the default SIM for data, voice, and SMS. The US version also forces a reboot each time the user switches eSIMs, while the non-US models do not.

Nokia X30 5G supports eSIM.

Sony Xperia 5 IV model XQ-CQ54 supports eSIM.

Design 
A traditional SIM card consists of an integrated circuit located on a universal integrated circuit card (UICC), typically made of PVC, which is manually inserted into a device. By contrast, an eSIM is a virtualized SIM card profile installed onto an eUICC chip permanently surface-mounted to a mobile device at the factory. The eUICC chip used to host the eSIM uses the same electrical interface as a physical SIM as defined in ISO/IEC 7816. Once an eSIM carrier profile has been installed on an eUICC, it operates the same as a physical SIM, complete with a unique ICCID and network authentication key generated by the carrier.

Usage 

An eSIM is typically provisioned remotely; end-users can add or remove operators without the need to physically swap a SIM from the device. All eSIMs are programmed with a permanent eSIM ID (EID) at the factory. This number is used by the provisioning service to associate the device with an existing carrier subscription as well as to negotiate a secure channel for programming.

Specifications 

eSIM is a global specification by the GSMA that enables remote SIM provisioning of any mobile device. GSMA defines eSIM as the SIM for the next generation of connected consumer devices. Networking solutions using eSIM technology can be widely applied to various Internet of Things (IoT) scenarios, including connected cars (smart rearview mirrors, on-board diagnostics (OBD), vehicle Wi-Fi hotspots), artificial intelligence translators, MiFi devices, smart earphones, smart metering, GPS tracking units, DTU, bike-sharing, advertising players, video surveillance devices, etc.

One common physical form factor of an eUICC chip is commonly designated MFF2.

The European Commission selected the eUICC format for its in-vehicle emergency call service, known as eCall, in 2012. All new car models in the EU must have one by 2018 to instantly connect the car to emergency services in case of an accident.

Russia has a similar plan with the GLONASS (national satellite positioning system) called ERA-GLONASS.

Singapore is seeking public opinions on introducing eSIM as a new standard, as more compatible devices enter the market.

iSIM and nuSIM 
In 2021, Deutsche Telekom introduced an alternative to eSIMs for smaller devices and the Internet of Things in form of integrated SIMs (iSIMs) fully integrated into a security enclave of the modem SoC (System on Chip). Called nuSIM they are smaller, cheaper and more eco-friendly since no extra hardware and plastic is required. In addition they can meet the same security requirements as a classical or eSIM; they ease the logistics and production of small devices. It can be expected that because of these advantages iSIMs will also replace the (e)SIMs in mobile phones and other connected consumer devices in future.

References

External links 

 eSIM overview from the GSMA

Mobile phone standards
Cryptographic hardware
Smart cards
Computer access control